Chalcosyrphus pachymera is a species of hoverfly in the family Syrphidae.

Distribution
Cuba, Puerto Rico.

References

Eristalinae
Insects described in 1866
Diptera of North America
Taxa named by Hermann Loew